The Village of Rochester Hills is a lifestyle center located in Rochester Hills, Michigan, a northern suburb of Detroit. Built in 2002, the center replaced a former enclosed shopping mall called Meadowbrook Village Mall. The Village of Rochester Hills features more than forty inline tenants as well as two anchor stores: Whole Foods Market, and Von Maur.

History
The northeastern corner of Walton Boulevard and Adams Road in Rochester Hills, Michigan was originally occupied by Meadowbrook Village Mall. This was a small enclosed shopping mall built in 1976, which did not feature any major anchor stores, and Frank's Nursery & Crafts as the largest tenant.

Starting in the mid-1980s, Meadowbrook Village Mall's owners, Robert B. Aikens & Associates, had made unsuccessful attempts to attract national chain stores to the mall. In 1996, the company made the decision to demolish the property for a lifestyle center complex anchored by a Parisian department store and a Farmer Jack Food Emporium supermarket, with the other stores arranged along a "main street." The Village of Rochester Hills opened on September 20, 2002 as the Detroit area's first lifestyle center, with more than fifty inline tenants, including the largest Talbots clothing store in the state, and the state's first Coldwater Creek. Upon opening the Village of Rochester Hills store, Detroit became the second most-profitable market for the Parisian chain.

In 2006 and 2007, Belk acquired the Parisian name and converted most of the Parisian stores to the Belk name, although the three Parisian stores in Michigan were sold to The Bon-Ton, which retained the Parisian name for these stores. Farmer Jack closed the last of its stores in 2007 when its parent company, The Great Atlantic & Pacific Tea Company (A&P), decided to exit the Detroit market, and Whole Foods Market moved from an existing store into the former Farmer Jack building.

Parisian was re-branded to Carson's in January 2013.

On April 18, 2018, The Bon-Ton filed for Chapter 7 bankruptcy, and announced the closure of all its locations, including the Carson's at the Village of Rochester Hills. The store closed on August 29, 2018. Von Maur acquired the former Parisian/Carson's building in November 2019, and began renovation work soon thereafter. The new Von Maur store, the chain's fourth Michigan location, opened on March 19, 2022.

In April 2019, Barnes & Noble opened a new store at the Village. This is a concept store, smaller than most Barnes & Noble locations.

References

External links
Website

Shopping malls established in 2002
Shopping malls in Oakland County, Michigan
Lifestyle centers (retail)
2002 establishments in Michigan